Christopher Lee Clark (born October 1, 1985) is a former American football offensive tackle. He was signed by the Tampa Bay Buccaneers as an undrafted free agent in 2008. He played college football at Southern Mississippi.

Professional career

Tampa Bay Buccaneers
Clark was signed by the Buccaneers as an undrafted free agent in 2008. He was released by the Buccaneers at the end of the preseason.

Minnesota Vikings
On September 10, 2008. Clark was signed to the Vikings' practice squad where he spent two years on the practice squad before being waived on September 4, 2010 during final cuts prior to the beginning of the 2010 NFL season.

Denver Broncos
On September 5, 2010 Clark was claimed off waivers by the Denver Broncos where he appeared in 69 regular-season games (27 starts) over five seasons with the Broncos.

Houston Texans
On August 31, 2015 Clark was traded to the Houston Texans for a seventh round pick in the 2016 NFL Draft.

On November 29, 2017, Clark was placed on injured reserve.

Carolina Panthers
On September 12, 2018, Clark was signed by the Carolina Panthers following injuries to Matt Kalil and Daryl Williams. He became their starting left tackle, starting 13 games.

New Orleans Saints
On August 12, 2019, Clark was signed by the New Orleans Saints. He was placed on injured reserve on August 21, 2019. He was released with an injury settlement on August 26.

Houston Texans (second stint)
On October 16, 2019, Clark was signed by the Houston Texans. He started seven games, six at right tackle and one at left.

References

External links
Chris Clark's Official Website
Denver Broncos bio
Southern Miss Golden Eagles bio

1985 births
Living people
Players of American football from New Orleans
American football offensive tackles
Southern Miss Golden Eagles football players
Tampa Bay Buccaneers players
Minnesota Vikings players
Denver Broncos players
Houston Texans players
Carolina Panthers players
New Orleans Saints players